Lorenzo Tehau is a footballer from Tahiti currently playing for A.S. Central Sport. He is the twin brother of Alvin Tehau, brother of Jonathan Tehau and cousin of Teaonui Tehau, all of them playing for Tahiti national football team.

He represented his country in the 2009 FIFA U-20 World Cup and now is a full-time member of the Tahiti national football team. He was the top goalscorer for Tahiti in the 2012 OFC Nations Cup, where his national side won the tournament for the first time.

International goals

Honours

Domestic
Tahiti First Division:
 Winner (2): 2010, 2011
Tahiti Cup:
 Winner (2): 2010, 2011

International
OFC Champions League:
 Runner-up (1): 2012
OFC Nations Cup:
 Winner (1): 2012

International career statistics

References

1989 births
Living people
French Polynesian footballers
Tahiti international footballers
2012 OFC Nations Cup players
2013 FIFA Confederations Cup players
Association football forwards
Association football midfielders